Agnes Strickland (18 July 1796 – 8 July 1874) was an English historical writer and poet. She is particularly remembered for her Lives of the Queens of England (12 vols, 1840–1848).

Biography
The daughter of Thomas Strickland and his wife Elizabeth ( Homer), Agnes was born in Rotherhithe, at that time in Surrey, where her father was employed as a manager of the Greenland Dock. She was christened at St Mary's Church, Rotherhithe on 18 August 1796. The family subsequently moved to Thorpe Hamlet, Norwich, and then Stowe House, near Bungay, Suffolk, before settling in 1808 at Reydon Hall, Reydon, near Southwold, also in Suffolk. Agnes' siblings were Elizabeth, Sarah, Jane Margaret, Catharine Parr Traill, Susanna Moodie (1803–1885), Thomas, and Samuel Strickland. Agnes and her elder sister, Elizabeth, were educated by their father to a standard more usual for boys at that time. All of the children except Sarah and Tom eventually became writers.

Agnes began her literary career with a poem, Worcester Field, followed by The Seven Ages of Woman and Demetrius. Abandoning poetry, she produced Historical Tales of Illustrious British Children (1833), The Pilgrims of Walsingham (1835), and Tales and Stories from History (1836). Her chief works, however, are Lives of the Queens of England from the Norman Conquest, Lives of the Queens of Scotland, and English Princesses, etc.. (8 vols., 1850–1859), Lives of the Bachelor Kings of England (1861), and Letters of Mary Queen of Scots, in some of which she was assisted by her sister Elizabeth. Strickland's researches were laborious and conscientious, and she remains a useful source. Her style is engaging and anecdotal, not as objective as most modern historians, but gives valuable insight into the mores of her own time.

Much of the Strickland sisters' historical research and writing was done by Elizabeth. Elizabeth, however, refused all publicity, and Agnes was named as the sole author. Their biographical works are fine representations of the biographies written by Victorian women, many of which focused on female subjects and included aspects of social history such as dress, manners, and diet.

Agnes' sisters Susanna Moodie and Catharine Parr Traill became particularly well known for their works about pioneer life in early Canada, where they both emigrated with their husbands in 1832. Agnes Strickland was a friend and correspondent of the Scottish poet and composer, Mary Maxwell Campbell.

Literary works

Biographies
 Lives of the Queens of England. 12 vols., 1840–1848
 The Letters of Mary Queen of Scots. 1842–1843
 Lives of the Queens of Scotland and English Princesses Connected with the Regal Succession of Great Britain. 8 Vols., 1851–1859
 Lives of the Bachelor Kings of England. 1861
 The Lives of the Seven Bishops Committed to the Tower in 1688. Enriched and Illustrated with Personal Letters, Now First Published, from the Bodleian Library. 1866
 Lives of the Tudor Princesses, Including Lady Jane Gray and Her Sisters. 1868
 Lives of the Last Four Princesses of the Royal House of Stuart. 1872

Children's books
 The Moss-House: In Which Many of the Works of Nature Are Rendered a Source of Amusement to Children. 1822
 The Tell-Tell. 1823
 The Aviary; Or, An Agreeable Visit. Intended for Children. 1824
 The Use of Sight: Or, I Wish I Were Julia : Intended for the Amusement and Instruction of Children. 1824
 The Little Tradesman, or, A Peep into English Industry. 1824
 The Young Emigrant. 1826
 The Rival Crusoes, or, The Shipwreck: Also A Voyage to Norway; and The Fisherman's Cottage : Founded on Facts. 1826
 The Juvenile Forget Me Not; Or, Cabinet of Entertainment and Instruction. 1827
 Historic Tales of Illustrious British Children. 1833
 Tales of the School Room. 1835
 Tales and Stories From History. 1836
 Alda, the British Captive. 1841

Sources
Attribution

References

External links

 
 
 
 
 
 WorldCat.org Accessed 29 June 2007
 Lives of the Queens of England, Vol. 1, 2, 3, 4, 5, 6, 7, 8, 9, 10, 11, 12, 13, 14, 15, 16
 

1796 births
1874 deaths
English women non-fiction writers
19th-century English historians
People from Southwold
19th-century English writers
19th-century English women writers
British women historians